Kevin Feige (born June 2, 1973) is an American film and television producer who has been the president of Marvel Studios and the primary producer of the Marvel Cinematic Universe franchise since 2007.

Feige is a member of the Producers Guild of America. In 2018, he was nominated for the Academy Award for Best Picture for producing Black Panther, the first superhero film to receive a Best Picture nomination and the first film in the Marvel Cinematic Universe to win an Academy Award. In October 2019, he became chief creative officer of Marvel Entertainment.

Early life 
Feige was born in Boston, Massachusetts and raised in Westfield, New Jersey, the son of Maralyn and Tim Feige. He moved to New Jersey at the age of eight and lived there until the age of eighteen, when he graduated from Westfield High School. His maternal grandfather, Robert E. Short, was a television producer in the 1950s, working on soap operas including The Guiding Light and As the World Turns.

After high school, Feige attended the University of Southern California, the alma mater of his favorite directors: George Lucas, Ron Howard and Robert Zemeckis. His first five applications to the USC School of Cinematic Arts were rejected, but he was accepted on the sixth. He graduated in 1995 with a degree in film.

Career 

His early work includes being assistant to executive producer Lauren Shuler Donner on Volcano and You've Got Mail.

In 2000, he was hired by Marvel as a producer. On the first X-Men film, Donner made Feige an associate producer, due to his knowledge of the Marvel Universe. Impressing Avi Arad, he was hired to work as his second-in-command at Marvel Studios that same year. In the mid-2000s, Feige realized that although  Spider-Man and the X-Men had been licensed to Sony and 20th Century Fox, Marvel still owned the rights to the core members of the Avengers, and envisioned creating a shared universe just as creators Stan Lee and Jack Kirby had done with their comic books in the early 1960s.

Feige was named president of production for Marvel Studios in March 2007.

Feige received the Motion Picture Showman of the Year award at the ICG Publicists Guild Awards on February 22, 2013.

For his work on Black Panther, Feige received nominations for an Academy Award, a Golden Globe Award, and a Producers Guild of America Award.

Feige was awarded the David O. Selznick Achievement Award in Theatrical Motion Pictures by the Producers Guild of America in 2019. In September 2019, it was reported that Feige was developing a Star Wars film for Lucasfilm, which was no longer in active development by March 2023.

In October 2019, Feige, in addition to being President of Marvel Studios, was named chief creative officer for Marvel Entertainment, Marvel Comics, Marvel Television and Marvel Animation.

Personal life 
Feige married Caitlin, a cardiothoracic nurse, around 2007. They have two children: a daughter born in 2009, and a son born in 2012.

Filmography

Film 
All films are as producer unless otherwise noted.

Television

Shorts

Awards and nominations

References

External links 

1973 births
21st-century American businesspeople
American chief executives
American chief executives in the media industry
American film producers
American film studio executives
Disney executives
Film producers from Massachusetts
Film producers from New Jersey
Inkpot Award winners
Living people
Marvel Entertainment people
Marvel Studios people
People from Boston
People from Westfield, New Jersey
USC School of Cinematic Arts alumni
Westfield High School (New Jersey) alumni